Nelson Street is a street in Mong Kok, Kowloon, Hong Kong, China. The street is 240 metres in length and runs in the east-west direction. It can be accessed from exits E1 and E2 of the Mong Kok station. The section between Portland and Sai Yeung Choi South Street is closed to vehicular traffic.

Name
The street was named after Horatio Nelson, 1st Viscount Nelson, a British flag officer in the Royal Navy.

Features
Mong Kok Computer Centre
Macpherson Stadium
Langham Place

Intersections
Hak Po Street
Tung Choi Street (Ladies Market)
Sai Yee Street
Fa Yuen Street
Nathan Road
Portland Street
Shanghai Street
Sai Yeung Choi Street
Reclamation Street
Canton Road
Ferry Street

References

External links
 

Mong Kok
Roads in Kowloon